Krishna Mohan Medical College and Hospital, Mathura, established in 2016, is a tertiary private medical college and hospital. It is located at Mathura in Uttar Pradesh. The college provides the degree of Bachelor of Medicine and Surgery (MBBS). The yearly undergraduate student intake is 150. In July 2020, the college faced scrutiny when they raised tuition by 7% amid the COVID-19 pandemic. The college informed students of the fee hike via Whattsapp only 16 days before the fees were due.

Affiliated
The college is affiliated with Atal Bihari Vajpayee Medical University and is recognized by the National Medical Commission.

References

Medical colleges in Uttar Pradesh
Mathura district
Educational institutions established in 2016
2016 establishments in Uttar Pradesh